Frelard Tamales is a Mexican restaurant in Seattle, in the U.S. state of Washington.

Description 
The Mexican restaurant specializes in tamales. Varieties include salsa roja pork, salsa verde chicken, and vegan and vegetarian options such as sweet potato and mole or salsa roja and jackfruit. The drink menu has included agua de horchata. Guests can purchase frozen tamales to prepare at home.

History 
Owners and spouses Osbaldo Hernandez and Dennis Ramey established in 2015 and began operating at farmers' markets. Plans to open a brick and mortar restaurant were confirmed in 2018.

In 2020, the restaurant served free food to select people impacted by the COVID-19 pandemic. Frelard also sold gift sets during the pandemic, with food and other products by local businesses.

Frelard has been a vendor at the U District Street Fair, and has celebrated LGBT pride month.

Reception 
In 2021, Kierra Elfalan of KING-TV said the restaurant "brings rich flavors, Hispanic culture to Seattle". Writers for Eater Seattle included Frelard in multiple lists in 2022, including "16 Marvelous Mexican Restaurants in the Seattle Area", "Some of the Best Inexpensive Meals in Seattle", "14 Fantastic Green Lake Restaurants", " and "The 38 Essential Restaurants in Seattle".

See also 

 List of Mexican restaurants

References

External links 

 

2015 establishments in Washington (state)
Mexican restaurants in Seattle
Restaurants established in 2015